Rickmansworth is an interchange railway station in  Rickmansworth, Hertfordshire,  northwest of central London, served by the London Underground Metropolitan line and by Chiltern Railways. It is one of the few London Underground stations beyond Greater London and as a consequence is in Travelcard Zone 7. The station is a good location to alight from to explore the Chess Valley.

History
The line to Rickmansworth was authorised in 1880 and the station opened on 1 September 1887 as the terminus of the Metropolitan Railway's extension from Pinner. In 1889, the line was extended from Rickmansworth to Chesham. Rickmansworth was shared with the Great Central Railway which reached Quainton Road in 1898. The extension of Metropolitan Line electrification brought electric services out to Rickmansworth on 5 January 1925, allowing the locomotive change point to be moved (north of Rickmansworth steam traction was provided by the LNER).

In 1925 another platform was constructed at the south end of the station for the Watford branch shuttle. There was a proposal in the New Works Programme to extend electrification to Aylesbury, but this was postponed at the outbreak of the Second World War. Afterwards, electrification reached Amersham with British Rail trains completing the journey to Aylesbury. The Rickmansworth-Watford shuttle ceased and the final steam train ran on 10 September 1961.

Electric locomotive-hauled trains on the Metropolitan were replaced with A60 and A62 Stock.  In 1987 the shuttle to Watford resumed, but only one each way, early morning and late evening.  This was later extended to Amersham when the new S8 Stock was introduced.

Rickmansworth is still one of few locations on the Met where train drivers are based and remains a changeover point for drivers on the Metropolitan line. The majority of LU trains heading north are timetabled to stop at Rickmansworth for about five minutes to change train staff. Rickmansworth hosts the headquarters of the operational side of the northern section of the Met, controlling signals on the line from Northwood to Watford and Chorleywood. Many evening-running Metropolitan trains terminate at Rickmansworth due to the number of sidings near the station.

In 2018, it was announced that the station would gain step free access by 2022, as part of a £200m investment to increase the number of accessible stations on London Underground.

Services
On London Underground, the station is served by trains on the Metropolitan line to Amersham and to Chesham from Baker Street and at peak times from Aldgate.

During peak-times, some Chiltern Line trains do not stop at Rickmansworth.

There are two tracks through the station, shared in both directions by London Underground and National Rail trains. A short third bay platform (now severed) is no longer used, but used to be the terminus for shuttles to Watford.

References

Bibliography 

Metropolitan line stations
Tube stations in Hertfordshire
Railway stations in Three Rivers District
Former Metropolitan and Great Central Joint Railway stations
Railway stations in Great Britain opened in 1887
Railway stations served by Chiltern Railways
Rickmansworth